The 2013–14 season is Kitchee's 35th season in the Hong Kong First Division League, the top flight of Hong Kong football, and their 83rd season in Hong Kong football. Kitchee will seek to reclaim the First Division League title after South China won it last season, as well as to defend their FA Cup champions. They will also compete in the Senior Challenge Shield this season.

As Kitchee have reached to the quarter-finals of the 2013 AFC Cup, they will also compete in the 2013 AFC Cup. On the other hand, they confirmed their qualification to the 2014 AFC Cup group stage as they defeated Tuen Mun 3–0 in the 2013 Hong Kong AFC Cup play-offs final.

Key events
 19 May 2013: Spanish forward Jonathan Carril completed a permanent transfer to Royal Southern after Carril spent almost the whole 2012–13 season on loan to Royal Southern.
 29 May 2013: Spanish forward Yago González joins fellow First Division club Royal Southern for free.
 29 May 2013: General manager Ken Ng confirmed that Spanish forward Jordi Tarrés has extended and signed a new 2-year contract with the club.
 29 May 2013: Tsang Chi Hau and Matt Lam have also extended and signed a new 2-year and 1-year contract with the club respectively. On the other hand, Liu Quankun will also stay at the club.
 30 May 2013: Hong Kong international midfielder Xu Deshuai joins the club from fellow First Division club Sun Pegasus for an undisclosed fee.
 30 May 2013: Hong Kong midfielder To Hon To joins the club from newly relegated Second Division club Wofoo Tai Po for free.
 31 May 2013: The club confirms that they will not extend Spanish striker Pablo Couñago's contract and he is free to join any club.
 9 June 2013: Nigerian striker Alex Tayo Akande joins the club from newly relegated Second Division club Wofoo Tai Po for free.
 9 June 2013: Ghanaian striker Christian Annan joins the club from newly relegated Second Division club Wofoo Tai Po for free.
 13 June 2013: Canadian-born Hong Kong midfielder Landon Ling leaves the club and joins fellow First Division club Sun Pegasus for an undisclosed fee.
 17 June 2013: English-born Hong Kong striker James Ha joins fellow First Division club Sunray Cave JC Sun Hei on a season-long loan.
 17 June 2013: Hong Kong midfielder Ngan Lok Fung joins fellow First Division club Royal Southern on a season-long loan.
 19 June 2013: Hong Kong striker Cheng Siu Wai leaves the club and joins newly promoted First Division club Eastern Salon for an undisclosed fee.
 20 June 2013: Hong Kong forward Chan Ho Fung joins fellow First Division club Sunray Cave JC Sun Hei on a season-long loan.
 20 June 2013: Hong Kong defender Li Ngai Hoi is expected to join fellow First Division club Sunray Cave JC Sun Hei on a season-long loan if his trial at Dalian Aerbin falls through.
 23 June 2013: Hong Kong midfielder Lo Chi Kwan joins fellow First Division club Royal Southern on a season-long loan.
 9 July 2013: Chinese-Hongkonger striker Liang Zicheng leaves the club and joins fellow First Division club Yokohama FC Hong Kong for an undisclosed fee.
 9 July 2013: Spanish striker Juan Belencoso joins the club from Segunda División B club Cádiz CF for an undisclosed fee.
 18 July 2013: Young English-Hong Kong midfielder Toby Philip Down leaves the club and joins fellow First Division club Citizen on a free transfer.
 7 August 2013: Hong Kong defender Li Ngai Hoi joins fellow First Division club Royal Southern on loan until the end of the season.
 12 November 2013: Pakistanian defender Zesh Rehman leaves the club and joins Malaysia Super League club Pahang FA on a free transfer.
 22 November 2013: Irish-Hong Kong midfielder Emmet Wan joins the club on a free transfer after a successful trial spell.
 27 December 2013: Australian defender Jordan Elsey joins the club on loan from A-League club Adelaide United until the end of the season.
 2 January 2014: Hong Kong striker James Ha is recalled from Sunray Cave JC Sun Hei by the club and has returned to the club.
 6 January 2014: Australian defender Jordan Elsey is recalled by parent club Adelaide United and leaves the club.
 6 January 2014: South Korean defender Jang Kyung-Jin joins the club from Korea National League club Ulsan Hyundai Mipo Dolphin FC on a free transfer.
 17 January 2014: Hong Kong striker James Ha leaves the club and joins fellow First Division club Royal Southern on loan until the end of the season.
 22 January 2014: Hong Kong defender Li Ngai Hoi has returned to the club from fellow First Division club Royal Southern and soon after he leaves the club and joins Chinese Super League club Changchun Yatai on an undisclosed fee.
 26 January 2014: Spanish striker Diego Cascón joins the club from Segunda División club Real Jaén for an undisclosed fee.

Players

Squad information

Last update: 23 January 2014
Source: Kitchee
Ordered by squad number.
LPLocal player; FPForeign player; APAsian player.

2013 AFC Cup Squad

Remarks:
FP These players are registered as foreign players.
AP These players are registered as AFC Asian players.

2014 AFC Cup squad

Remarks:
FP These players are registered as foreign players.
AP These players are registered as AFC Asian players.

Transfers

In

Out

Loan In

Loan out

Club

Coaching staff

Statistics
Note: Voided matches are not counted in the statistics except discipline records.

Overall Stats
{|class="wikitable" style="text-align: center;"
|-
!width="100"|
!width="60"|League
!width="60"|Shield
!width="60"|FA Cup
!width="60"|2013AFC Cup
!width="60"|2014AFC Cup
!width="60"|Total Stats
|-
|align=left|Games played    ||  16 ||  1  || 2  ||  2  || 5  || 26
|-
|align=left|Games won       ||  13 ||  0  || 1  ||  0  || 4  || 18
|-
|align=left|Games drawn     ||  3  ||  0  || 1  ||  0  || 1  || 5
|-
|align=left|Games lost      ||  0  ||  1  || 0  ||  2  || 0  || 3
|-
|align=left|Goals for       ||  40 ||  1  || 5  ||  2  || 15 || 63
|-
|align=left|Goals against   ||  10 ||  2  || 0  ||  4  || 3  || 19
|- =
|align=left|Players used    ||  24 ||  14 || 15 ||  13 || 18 || 241
|-
|align=left|Yellow cards    ||  29 ||  3  || 4  ||  4  || 7  || 48
|-
|align=left|Red cards       ||  0  ||  0  || 0  ||  0  || 0  || 0
|-

Players Used: Kitchee have used a total of 24 different players in all competitions.

Appearances

Last updated: 17 April 2014

Top scorers

Last updated: 17 April 2014

Disciplinary record

Substitution Record
Includes all competitive matches.

Last updated: 17 April 2014

Captains

Competitions

Overall

First Division League

Classification

Results summary

Results by round

Matches

Pre-season friendlies

First Division League

Senior Shield

FA Cup

2013 AFC Cup

Quarter-finals
The draw of quarter-finals was held on 20 June 2013 in Kuala Lumpur, Malaysia. Kitchee will face Jordan Premier League club Al-Faisaly who were the champions for 2005 and 2006 editions.

2014 AFC Cup

Group stage

See also
List of unbeaten football club seasons

Notes

References

Kitchee SC seasons
Kit